The 2013 Vaahteraliiga season was the 34th season of the highest level of American football in Finland. The regular season took place between May 19 and August 18, 2013. The Finnish champion was determined in the playoffs and at the championship game Vaahteramalja XXXIV the Helsinki Roosters won the Helsinki Wolverines.

Standings

Playoffs

References

American football in Finland
Vaahteraliiga
Vaahteraliiga